"If U Were My Man" is a song by German singer–songwriter Sarah Connor from her debut album, Green Eyed Soul (2001). It was the only single not released in Connor's native Germany.

"If U Were My Man" was originally set to be the first single from Green Eyed Soul, but "Let's Get Back to Bed - Boy!" was chosen instead. It was one of the first songs Connor recorded to shop to major labels and created quite a bit of buzz around her.

The song was released as the album's fourth and final single on 8 July 2002, and did not manage to chart noticeably. A promo was made for Polish release though it apparently never occurred. Rumors that "If U Were My Man" would be released in Germany and the rest of Europe were eventually proven false once Connor decided to embark on her first tour instead.

Track listings and formats
European CD single
"If U Were My Man" (Pop Version) – 3:39
"If U Were My Man" (Album Version) – 3:38

Unreleased Polish promo CD single
"If U Were My Man"

External links
"If U Were My Man" discography at Absolute Sarah Connor

2001 singles
Sarah Connor (singer) songs
2001 songs
X-Cell Records singles
Songs written by Troy Samson
Songs written by Bülent Aris